The 2019–20 AWIHL season is the thirteenth season of the Australian Women's Ice Hockey League (AWIHL). It ran from 26 October 2019 until 2 February 2020. Five teams competed in 30 regular season games followed by 4 playoff games, making up the AWIHL Finals weekend. The Sydney Sirens claimed the double by winning both the premiership title for finishing top of the regular season standings and the Joan McKowen Memorial Trophy championship title by winning the grand final. Adelaide Rush finished runner-up to both titles and the Brisbane Goannas claimed the wooden spoon.

Teams

In 2019–20 the AWIHL had five teams from five Australian state capital cities competing, stretching east to west of the continent.

League Business

The official AWIHL gameday schedule was released at the end of September 2019. The season structure remained unchanged from 2018-19, with each team playing two of the four opponents in a four game series with the other two teams being played twice during the season. The AWIHL announced on 4 October a new travel partnership with SportsLink Travel, that would provide the five teams in the league a cost equalisation program for airfares and bus transfers. In November 2019, the league struck an agreement with Kayo Sports to stream a 'game of the week' and 20 minutes of highlights and player interviews for the 2019–20 season on Kayo's nationally available streaming service.

Regular season

Fixtures & results
Running between 26 October 2019 and 19 January 2020, the AWIHL regular season consisted of 30 games in total. On 17 January 2020, the AWIHL commission made the decision to treat the 12 January 2020 game between Melbourne Ice and Perth Inferno as a draw and award both teams 1 point each. Initially the Inferno were awarded 2 points for winning in overtime, however the game did not progress to a shootout and a 3v3 overtime period was played instead, against league regulations.

October

November

December

January

Key:

Standings

Player stats
The season's league leader statistics for skaters and goaltenders.

Season awards

Below lists the 2019–20 AWIHL regular season award winners.

Joan McKowen playoffs
The top four teams in the AWIHL regular season qualify for the Joan McKowen Memorial Trophy playoffs. The playoffs is held on a single weekend and uses Australian conventions of being called Finals. The playoff system used by the AWIHL is a four team single game semi-finals and grand final system where the semi-final winners progress to the grand final and the losers playoff for third place. Semi-finals are played on the Saturday and the third place and grand final is played on the Sunday. The prize for being crowned AWIHL Champions for winning the grand final is the Joan McKowen Memorial Trophy.

In 2019–20, the Sirens, Rush, Ice and Inferno qualified for the finals weekend. In late January 2020, the AWIHL released an annual finals promo video to promote the event as well as naming the officials for the weekend. The event was held on 1 and 2 February 2020 in host city Melbourne at O’Brien Icehouse. Sydney and Adelaide won on Saturday to advance to the Joan McKowen Final, with Perth and Melbourne heading to the third place playoff. Melbourne Ice won playoff on Sunday to secure third place for the season, Perth finishing fourth. In the grand final, Sydney Sirens produced a strong display to shutout the Rush and secure the Championship title and the Joan McKowen Memorial Trophy. It is the second championship title in Sirens history.

Semi-finals

Third place playoff

Final

References

External links 
Australian Women's Hockey League
Ice Hockey Australia

Australian Women's Ice Hockey League seasons
Aust
ice hockey
ice hockey